Sinak or Senak may refer to:

in Iran
Sinak, Markazi, a village in Taraznahid Rural District, in the Central District of Saveh County, Markazi Province, Iran
Sinak, Qazvin, a village in Afshariyeh Rural District, Khorramdasht District, Takestan County, Qazvin Province, Iran
Sinak, Tehran, a village in Lavasan-e Kuchak Rural District, Lavasanat District, Shemiranat County, Tehran Province, Iran
in Indonesia
Sinak, Indonesia, a town in Papua, Indonesia, location of Sinak Airport